The Arthur Rubinstein International Piano Master Competition is an international piano competition specializing in the music championed by Arthur Rubinstein. The competition has been held every three years in Tel Aviv, Israel since 1974.

History
The Arthur Rubinstein International Piano Master Competition came in­to being in 1973, at the initiative of Jan Jacob Bistritzky, a close friend of Arthur Rubinstein, who was honored to give his name to the Competition.

Conceived in the spirit of this legend­ary pianist, the Competition is com­mitted to attaining standards of the highest order and is a valid interna­tional forum for presenting talented, aspiring young pianists and fostering their artistic careers.

The Competition first took place in 1974 and is held every three years.

Rubinstein himself attend­ed the first two competitions, when the winners were Emanuel Ax and Gerhard Oppitz, renowned pi­anists today.

In 2003 pianist Idith Zvi succeeded Mr. Bistritzky as Artistic Director, a role she held until her retirement in 2020. Since July 2020, the Artistic Director of the Competition is pianist Ariel Cohen.

The past 40+ years of its history have continuously produced pianists who went on to international acclaim: Gerhard Oppitz, Angela Cheng, Alexander Korsantia, Kirill Gerstein, Alexander Gavrylyuk; Igor Levit, Khatia Buniatishvili, Boris Giltburg, David Fung, Daniil Trifonov and others.

Winners

See also
Music of Israel

References

External links
Arthur Rubinstein International Piano Master Competition State Medals

Piano competitions
Classical music awards
Culture in Tel Aviv
Awards established in 1974
1974 establishments in Israel
Music competitions in Israel